The Dukedom of Lancaster is an English peerage merged in the crown. It was created three times in the Middle Ages, but finally merged in the Crown when Henry V succeeded to the throne in 1413. Despite the extinction of the dukedom the title has continued to be used to refer to the reigning monarch of the United Kingdom in relation to the County Palatine of Lancaster and the Duchy of Lancaster, an estate held separately from the Crown Estate for the benefit of the sovereign.

History

There were three creations of the Dukedom of Lancaster during the fourteenth and fifteenth centuries. The first creation was on 6 March 1351 for Henry of Grosmont, 4th Earl of Lancaster, a great-grandson of Henry III; he was also 4th Earl of Leicester, 1st Earl of Derby, 1st Earl of Lincoln and Lord of Bowland. When he died in 1361 the peerage became extinct.

The second creation was on 13 November 1362, for John of Gaunt, 1st Earl of Richmond and third surviving son of King Edward III. He became Henry of Grosmont's son-in-law through his marriage to Blanche of Lancaster, Henry's second daughter and eventual heir. When Gaunt died on 4 February 1399 the dukedom passed to his son, Henry of Bolingbroke, 1st Duke of Hereford. Later that same year Bolingbroke usurped the throne of England from Richard II, becoming Henry IV, at which point the Dukedom merged in the Crown.

Henry re-created the dukedom on 10 November 1399 for his eldest son Henry of Monmouth, Prince of Wales. In 1413 Monmouth ascended the throne as King Henry V and the dukedom merged in the crown again, where it has remained ever since.

Nevertheless, the title continues to be used to refer to the monarch in relation to Lancashire and the Duchy of Lancaster, the estate associated with the former dukedom. It was customary at formal dinners in the historic county boundaries of Lancashire and in Lancastrian regiments of the armed forces for the Loyal Toast to be announced as "The King, Duke of Lancaster". In addition, in Lancaster it is still common to hear the national anthem sung as "God save our gracious King, long live our noble Duke". However, the legal basis for the sovereign to use the title has been disputed as the right to the title may have had different heirs to the right to the duchy’s lands. In particular, George V was given legal advice that it was “extremely unlikely” that he was the Duke of Lancaster.

First creation, 1351–1361 

| Henry of GrosmontHouse of Plantagenet
|  || Grosmont Castleson of Henry, 3rd Earl of Lancaster and Maud Chaworth|| Isabel of Beaumont2 children
| 23 March 1361Leicester Castleaged 50–51
|-
| colspan="5" | Henry of Grosmont died in 1361 without male issue.
|}

Second creation, 1362–1399 

| John of GauntHouse of Lancaster 
| 
| 6 March 1340Ghentson of Edward III and Philippa of Hainault|| Blanche of Lancaster19 May 1359 – 12 September 13688 childrenConstance of Castile21 September 1371 – 24 March 13942 childrenKatherine Swynford13 January 13964 children
| 3 February 1399Leicester Castleaged 58
|-
| Henry BolingbrokeHouse of Lancaster
| 
| Bolingbroke Castleson of John of Gaunt and Blanche of Lancaster
| Mary de Bohun  – 4 June 13946 childrenJoan of Navarre7 February 1403no children
| 20 March 1413Westminsteraged 46
|-
| colspan=5 | Henry Bolingbroke seized the throne as Henry IV in 1399, and all of his titles merged with the crown.
|}

Third creation, 1399–1413

| Henry of MonmouthHouse of Lancaster
| 
| 16 September 1386Monmouth Castleson of Henry IV and Mary de Bohun|| Catherine of Valois2 June 14201 child
| 31 August 1422Château de Vincennesaged 35
|-
| colspan=5 | Henry of Monmouth succeeded to the throne as Henry V in 1413, and his titles merged with the crown.
|}

Family tree

References

External links
Duchy of Lancaster website – Duke of Lancaster
"Of the Countries Subject to the Laws of England," from Commentaries on the Laws of England, Introduction, chapter 4, by Sir William Blackstone, 1765 (see text following footnote 72)

 
Extinct dukedoms in the Peerage of England
British and Irish peerages which merged in the Crown
Noble titles created in 1351
Noble titles created in 1362
Noble titles created in 1399